Abingdon may refer to:

Places

United Kingdom
Abingdon-on-Thames, Oxfordshire
 Abingdon (UK Parliament constituency) 1558–1983
 Abingdon railway station (closed)

United States
Abingdon, Iowa
Abingdon, Illinois
Abingdon, Maryland
Abingdon, Virginia
Abingdon (plantation), Virginia

Other countries
 Abingdon Downs, Queensland, Australia
Abingdon Airport
Abingdon, Ontario, Canada
Abingdon Island, Galápagos Islands, Ecuador

Other uses
Abingdon (1902 automobile)
Abingdon (1922 automobile)
Abingdon Arms, in Oxford, England
Abingdon Motorcycles, a former British motorcycle manufacturer
Abingdon Press, publishing house of the United Methodist Church
Abingdon Road, in Oxford, England
Abingdon School, in Abingdon-on-Thames, England
Earl of Abingdon, a title in the Peerage of England
, a U.S. Navy ship

See also

Abington (disambiguation)